James "Bobo" "Bull" Leonard was an American baseball outfielder in the Negro leagues. He played from 1921 to 1928, spending time with several clubs, including three seasons with the Cleveland Tate Stars.

References

External links
 and Baseball-Reference Black Baseball stats and Seamheads

Cleveland Browns (baseball) players
Cleveland Tate Stars players
Chicago American Giants players
Lincoln Giants players
Indianapolis ABCs players
Baltimore Black Sox players
Bacharach Giants players
Cleveland Elites players
Homestead Grays players
Year of birth missing
Year of death missing
Baseball outfielders